Žiga Kočevar (born 4 March 1994) is a Slovenian footballer who plays for Krka.

References

External links
PrvaLiga profile 

1994 births
Living people
Slovenian footballers
Association football midfielders
People from Črnomelj
NK Bela Krajina players
NK Krka players